This page presents the results of the men's and women's volleyball tournament during the 1963 Pan American Games, which was held from April 24 to May 3, 1963 in São Paulo, Brazil.

Men's indoor tournament

Preliminary round robin

Final ranking

Women's indoor tournament

Preliminary round robin

Final ranking

References
 Men's results
 Women's results

1963
1963 Pan American Games
Pan American Games